Radical 66 or radical rap meaning "" is one of the 34 Kangxi radicals (214 radicals in total) composed of 4 strokes. It is also used to represent a folding chair.

In the Kangxi Dictionary, there are 296 characters (out of 49,030) to be found under this radical.

 is also the 74th indexing component in the Table of Indexing Chinese Character Components predominantly adopted by Simplified Chinese dictionaries published in mainland China, with  being its associated indexing component.

Evolution

Derived characters

Literature

External links

Unihan Database - U+6534

066
074